R571 road may refer to:
 R571 road (Ireland)
 R571 road (South Africa)